Sleight of Heart is the fourth studio album by Scottish singer-songwriter Malcolm Middleton, released on 3 March 2008 on Full Time Hobby. The album was recorded in the summer of 2007 at Chem 19 Studios in Blantyre.

Artwork
Behind the CD there is a photograph of Middleton sitting in a chair, playing guitar. This same chair appears in the artwork to Middleton's previous album, A Brighter Beat, only the chair is empty.

Track listing
Songs, lyrics and music by Malcolm Middleton except where mentioned.
"Week Off" – 3:33
"Blue Plastic Bags" – 3:25
"Total Belief" – 4:01
"Just Like Anything" – 2:36 (Jackson C. Frank)
"Follow Robin Down" – 3:02
"Stay" – 4:02 (Madonna/Steve Bray)
"Marguerita Red" – 2:51 (King Creosote)
"Love Comes in Waves" – 7:05
"Hey You" – 2:49

Personnel
Malcolm Middleton – guitar, vocals
Barry Burns – piano
Jenny Reeve – violin, vocals
 Stevie Jones – double bass
Paul Savage – drums, recording, mixing
Greg Calbi – mastering

Accolades

References

Sleight of Heart
Full Time Hobby albums
Malcolm Middleton albums